Soul Talk is an album by jazz organist Johnny "Hammond" Smith recorded for the Prestige label in 1969.

Reception

The Allmusic site awarded the album 4½ stars, calling it "a solid, no-surprise set of soul-jazz".

Track listing
All compositions by Johnny "Hammond" Smith except where noted
 "Soul Talk" - 9:30   
 "All Soul" (Curtis Lewis) - 5:30   
 "Up to Date" - 7:50   
 "Purty Dirty" (Wally Richardson) - 6:05   
 "This Guy's in Love with You" (Burt Bacharach, Hal David) - 4:25

Personnel
Johnny "Hammond" Smith - organ
Rusty Bryant - tenor saxophone, alto saxophone, varitone
Wally Richardson - guitar
Bob Bushnell - electric bass
Bernard Purdie - drums

Production
 Bob Porter - producer
 Rudy Van Gelder - engineer

References

Johnny "Hammond" Smith albums
1969 albums
Prestige Records albums
Albums produced by Bob Porter (record producer)
Albums recorded at Van Gelder Studio